Stanford is both a surname and a masculine given name. Notable people with the name include:

Surname:
Aaron Stanford (born 1976), American film actor
Ala Stanford, American physician
Alan Stanford, Irish actor/director
Al Bourke (born Alan Stanford in 1928), Australian boxer of the 1940s and '50s 
Allen Stanford, American businessman and fraudster
Charles Villiers Stanford (1852–1924), Irish composer of classical and church music
Cliff Stanford, co-founder of the ISP Demon Internet
Craig Stanford, Professor of Anthropology and Biological Sciences at the Jane Goodall Research Center
Edward Stanford, founder of map and book publisher Stanford's
Frank Stanford (1948–1978), American poet
Henry King Stanford (born 1916), former President of the University of Georgia
J. K. Stanford (1892–1971), British writer and ornithologist
Jason Gray-Stanford (born 1970), Canadian film and television actor
Karin Stanford, Professor of Pan-African Studies, California State University
Leland Stanford (1824–1893), American businessman, politician, founder of Stanford University
Jane Stanford (1828–1905), widow of Leland Stanford
Leland Stanford, Jr. (1868–1884), son of Leland and Jane Stanford
Martin Stanford, British TV presenter
Miles J. Stanford (1914–1999), American Christian author
Non Stanford, professional British triathlete
Peter Thomas Stanford, African-American religious minister and writer
Phil Stanford, American journalist and author
Rawghlie Clement Stanford (1879–1963), 9th governor of Arizona
Richard Stanford (disambiguation)
Sally Stanford (1903–1982), madam, restaurateur, and mayor of Sausalito, California
Trevor Herbert Stanford, real name of English pianist Russ Conway.
William Bedell Stanford (1911–1984), Irish classical scholar, senator, Chancellor of the University of Dublin

Given name:
Stanford Keglar (1985–present), American football player.
Stanford Moore (1913–1982), American biochemist. He shared a Nobel Prize in Chemistry in 1972.
Stanford Morse (1926–2002), American politician
Stanford Parris (1929–2010), American politician
Stanford Samuels (born 1980), American football player
Stanford Samuels III (born 1999), American football player
Stanford White (1853 – 1906), American architect

English-language surnames
Masculine given names
English masculine given names